Wilhelm Malte II, Fürst und Herr zu Putbus, born Wilhelm Carl Gustav Malte, Reichsgraf von Wylich und Lottum (16 April 183318 April 1907) was a Prussian general and statesman. After the death of his maternal grandfather Wilhelm Malte I the house of Putbus  went extinct in the male line. In 1861 by decision of King Wilhelm I of Prussia the succession to the house of Putbus was past down to Wilhelm C.G. Malte and he was given the title of Prince (Fürst) of Putbus.

Biography 
He was the second son of Count Hermann Friedrich von Wylich und Lottum (1796–1849) and his wife Clothilde, née Countess zu Putbus (1809–1894). His paternal grandfather was the Prussian general and finance minister Carl Friedrich Heinrich, Graf von Wylich und Lottum, his maternal grandfather was Prince Wilhelm Malte I of Putbus, Vice Governor of Swedish Pomerania and from 1817 of Prussian New Western Pomerania.

After the death of Prince Wilhelm Malte I on 26 September 1854, his wife Princess Luise, divorced Countess von Veltheim, née Freiin von Lauterbach, inherited the Majorat as a previous heir. The only son of the princely couple, Count Malte (1807–1837) was unmarried and died without a legitimate heir (his illegitimate son was not entitled to inherit). When Princess Luise died on 27 September 1860, Wilhelm Carl Gustav Malte, the second son of Clothilde, the eldest daughter of the princely couple, took over the inheritance.

At the express request of Prince Wilhelm Malte I, the Swedish document of 1807 on his elevation to the rank of prince had stipulated that only the direct male successors should be entitled to the title of prince. In 1817, King Frederick William III had confirmed the rank of prince for Prussia. Therefore, in March 1861, contrary to Swedish provision, the Prussian King Wilhelm I raised his grandson Wilhelm Malte, Graf von Wylich und Lottum with the title Prince and Lord of Putbus to the Prussian princely status. Wilhelm Malte II was a member of the Prussian House of Lords, until 1888 Obersttruchseß, as well as Hereditary Lord Marshal in the Principality of Rügen and the Land of Barth.  As Prince of Putbus, he was entitled to a viril vote, he was a member of the Provincial Parliament of the Province of Pomerania.

Already under Wilhelm Malte I there were close relations between the Prussian royal house and the house of Putbus. King Frederick William IV visited the princely residence in Putbus as crown prince in 1820, 1825 and in 1843, 1846, and 1853 as king. The close ties between Putbus and Berlin were further strengthened under Wilhelm Malte II In 1860, still under the reign of Princess Luise, Crown Prince Frederick and his wife Victoria visited the residential palace in Putbus.

From 1818 to the middle of the 19th century, Lauterbach, a district of Putbus, was a luxury bath of the nobility, despite its distance to the sea. In order to make the residence even more attractive for bathers, Wilhelm Malte II ordered the construction of a railway line from Putbus to the seaside resort of Binz, which was inaugurated in the summer of 1895. Four years later, the entire line to Göhren was completed.

In 1860 Putbus joined the Order of St. John as a Knight of Honour and became a Knight of the Law in 1867; he was a member of the Pomeranian Cooperative of the Order.  The extensive possessions of the prince included several manors and estates, partly managed by himself, individually also leased, even to Putbus Castle belonged an assigned 732 ha manor.

He is buried at the Putbus family crypt at Vilmnitz Church.

Progeny

Ancestry 

Wilhelm Malte II married his cousin Wanda Maria Freiin von Veltheim-Bartensleben (1837–1867), later Princess Wanda von Putbus, on 1 July 1857. The daughters of the first princely couple (Wilhelm Malte I and Luise), Clothilde (1809–1894), married to Count Hermann Friedrich von Wylich und Lottum, and Asta Luise (1812–1850), married to Franz von Veltheim (1812–1874), were the mothers of the second princely couple. Princess Wanda died on 18 December 1867 in Berlin, sixteen days after the birth of her fifth daughter Wanda Auguste.
They had five daughters:

 Marie Luise Clotilde Agnes, Countess of Wylich and Lottum, Princess of Putbus (1858–1930) 1877 Franz von Veltheim (1848–1927) ⚭
 Asta Eugenie Countess of Wylich and Lottum, Princess of Putbus (1860–1934) Karl von Riepenhausen (1852–1929) ⚭
 Victoria Wanda, Countess of Wylich and Lottum (1861–1933) ⚭ 17 January 1888 Ludolph Heinrich von Veltheim
 Margarethe Rosa Alma, Countess of Wylich and Lottum (1864–1948) Hans Wurmb von Zinck (1849–1892) ⚭
 Wanda Auguste, Countess of Wylich and Lottum (1867–1930) Ernst zu Löwenstein-Wertheim-Freudenberg (1854–1931) ⚭

The heiress of the principality was first the eldest daughter Marie, then her next younger sister Asta. Since both had no surviving descendants, the Princely Putbus Fideikommiss fell in 1934 to the son of the third daughter Victoria, Malte von Veltheim-Lottum, who took the family name Malte von und zu Putbus on 20 October 1938 with the approval of the Reich Minister of the Interior. He died in 1945 in the Sachsenhausen concentration camp.

Images

Honours and awards 
 :
 Grand Cross of the Order of the Red Eagle.
 Commander of the Royal House Order of Hohenzollern.
 Knight of Honour of the Order of Saint John, (Bailiwick of Brandenburg).
 Iron Cross 2nd Class (1870).
 :
Grand Cross of the Military Merit Order.
   Sweden-Norway: 
 Commander of the Order of Vasa.
  Mecklenburg-Schwerin:
 Grand Cross of the Order of the Wendish Crown,

Arms

Buildings

References 

1833 births
1907 deaths
Prussian people of the Austro-Prussian War
German military personnel of the Franco-Prussian War
German Christians
German princes
Members of the Prussian House of Lords
People from the Province of Pomerania
Recipients of the Iron Cross (1870), 2nd class
Commanders of the Order of Vasa
Grand Crosses of the Military Merit Order (Bavaria)
Recipients of the Military Merit Cross (Mecklenburg-Schwerin), 1st class
History of Pomerania
Prussian politicians
German legislators (1815–1945)
German people of Swedish descent
German military officers